Yermy Adalberto Hernández Alvarez (born December 2, 1980) is a Honduran football defender who currently plays for Victoria in the Liga Nacional de Honduras.

Club career
He made his senior debut with Real España and had a short spell at Platense. After a season abroad with Guatemalan side Heredia, he joined Hispano. He moved to Victoria before the 2011 Apertura season.

International career
Hernández made his debut for Honduras in a friendly match against Venezuela and has earned a total of 3 caps, scoring no goals. He has represented his country at the 2007 UNCAF Nations Cup.

His final international was a February 2007 UNCAF Nations Cup match against Panama.

References

External links 

1980 births
Living people
People from La Ceiba
Association football defenders
Honduran footballers
Honduras international footballers
Real C.D. España players
Platense F.C. players
Hispano players
C.D. Victoria players
Liga Nacional de Fútbol Profesional de Honduras players
Honduran expatriate footballers
Expatriate footballers in Guatemala
2007 UNCAF Nations Cup players